Space travel, or space flight (less often, starfaring or star voyaging) is a classic science-fiction theme that has captivated the public and is almost archetypal for science fiction. Space travel, interplanetary or interstellar, is usually performed in space ships, and spacecraft propulsion in various works ranges from the scientifically plausible to the totally fictitious. 

While some writers focus on realistic, scientific, and educational aspects of space travel, with other writers the concept may be seen as a metaphor for freedom, including "free[ing] mankind from the prison of the solar system". Though the science-fiction rocket has been described as a 20th-century icon, according to The Encyclopedia of Science Fiction "The means by which space flight has been achieved in sf – its many and various spaceships – have always been of secondary importance to the mythical impact of the theme". Works related to space travel have popularized such concepts as time dilation, space stations, and space colonization.

While generally associated with science fiction, space travel has also occasionally featured in fantasy, sometimes involving magic or supernatural entities such as angels.

History 

A classic, defining trope of the science-fiction genre is that the action takes place in space, either aboard a spaceship or on another planet. Early works of science fiction, termed "proto SF" – such as novels by 17th-century writers Francis Godwin and Cyrano de Bergerac, and by astronomer Johannes Kepler – include "lunar romances", much of whose action takes place on the Moon. Science-fiction critic George Slusser also pointed to Christopher Marlowe's Doctor Faustus (1604) – in which the main character is able to see the entire earth from high above – and noted the connections of space travel to earlier dreams of flight and air travel, as far back as the writings of Plato and Socrates. In such a grand view, space travel, and inventions such as various forms of "star drive", can be seen as metaphors for freedom, including "free[ing] mankind from the prison of the solar system".

In the following centuries, while science fiction addressed many aspects of futuristic science as well as space travel, space travel proved the more influential with the genre's writers and readers, evoking their sense of wonder. Most works were mainly intended to amuse readers, but a small number, often by authors with a scholarly background, sought to educate readers about related aspects of science, including astronomy; this was the motive of the influential American editor Hugo Gernsback, who dubbed it "sugar-coated science" and "scientifiction". Science-fiction magazines, including Gernsback's Science Wonder Stories, alongside works of pure fiction, discussed the feasibility of space travel; many science-fiction writers also published nonfiction works on space travel, such as Willy Ley's articles and David Lasser's book, The Conquest of Space (1931).

From the late 19th and early 20th centuries on, there was a visible distinction between the more "realistic", scientific fiction (which would later evolve into hard sf)), whose authors, often scientists like Konstantin Tsiolkovsky and Max Valier, focused on the more plausible concept of interplanetary travel (to the Moon or Mars); and the more grandiose, less realistic stories of "escape from Earth into a Universe filled with worlds", which gave rise to the genre of space opera, pioneered by E. E. Smith and popularized by the television series Star Trek, which debuted in 1966. This trend continues to the present, with some works focusing on "the myth of space flight", and others on "realistic examination of space flight"; the difference can be described as that between the authors' concern with the "imaginative horizons rather than hardware". 

The successes of 20th-century space programs, such as the Apollo 11 Moon landing, have often been described as "science fiction come true" and have served to further "demystify" the concept of space travel within the solar system. Henceforth writers who wanted to focus on the "myth of space travel" were increasingly likely to do so through the concept of interstellar travel. Edward James wrote that many science fiction stories have "explored the idea that without the constant expansion of humanity, and the continual extension of scientific knowledge, comes stagnation and decline." While the theme of space travel has generally been seen as optimistic, some stories by revisionist authors, often more pessimistic and disillusioned, juxtapose the two types, contrasting the romantic myth of space travel with a more down-to-earth reality. George Slusser suggests that "science fiction travel since World War II has mirrored the United States space program: anticipation in the 1950s and early 1960s, euphoria into the 1970s, modulating into skepticism and gradual withdrawal since the 1980s."

On the screen, the 1902 French film A Trip to the Moon, by Georges Méliès, described as the first science-fiction film, linked special effects to  depictions of spaceflight. With other early films, such as Woman in the Moon (1929) and Things to Come (1936), it contributed to an early recognition of  the rocket as the iconic, primary means of space travel, decades before space programs began. Later milestones in film and television include the Star Trek series and films, and the film 2001: A Space Odyssey by Stanley Kubrick (1968), which visually advanced the concept of space travel, allowing it to evolve from the simple rocket toward a more complex space ship. Stanley Kubrick's 1968  epic film  featured a lengthy sequence of interstellar travel through a mysterious "star gate". This sequence, noted for its psychedelic special effects conceived by Douglas Trumbull, influenced a number of later cinematic depictions of superluminal and hyperspatial travel, such as Star Trek: The Motion Picture (1979). I

Means of travel 
Generic terms for engines enabling science-fiction spacecraft propulsion include "space drive" and "star drive". In 1977 The Visual Encyclopedia of Science Fiction listed the following means of space travel: anti-gravity, atomic (nuclear), bloater, cannon one-shot, Dean drive, faster-than-light (FTL), hyperspace, Inertialess drive, Ion thruster, photon rocket, plasma propulsion engine, Bussard ramjet, R. force, solar sail, spindizzy, and torchship. 

The 2007 Brave New Words: The Oxford Dictionary of Science Fiction lists the following terms related to the concept of space drive: gravity drive, hyperdrive, ion drive, jump drive, overdrive, ramscoop (a synonym for ram-jet), reaction drive, stargate, ultradrive, warp drive and torchdrive. Several of these terms are entirely fictitious or are based on "rubber science", while others are based on real scientific theories. Many fictitious means of travelling through space, in particular, faster than light travel, tend to go against the current understanding of physics, in particular, the theory of relativity. Some works sport numerous alternative star drives; for example the Star Trek universe, in addition to its iconic "warp drive", has introduced concepts such as "transwarp", "slipstream" and "spore drive", among others.

Many, particularly early, writers of science fiction did not address means of travel in much detail, and many writings of the "proto-SF" era were disadvantaged by their authors' living in a time when knowledge of space was very limited — in fact, many early works did not even consider the concept of vacuum and instead assumed that an atmosphere of sorts, composed of air or "aether", continued indefinitely. Highly influential in popularizing the science of science fiction was the 19th-century French writer Jules Verne, whose means of space travel in his 1865 novel, From the Earth to the Moon (and its sequel, Around the Moon), was explained mathematically, and whose vehicle — a gun-launched space capsule — has been described as the first such vehicle to be "scientifically conceived" in fiction. Percy Greg's Across the Zodiac (1880) featured a spaceship with a small garden, an early precursor of hydroponics. Another writer who attempted to merge concrete scientific ideas with science fiction was the turn-of-the-century Russian writer and scientist, Konstantin Tsiolkovsky, who popularized the concept of rocketry. George Mann mentions  Robert A. Heinlein's Rocket Ship Galileo (1947) and Arthur C. Clarke's Prelude to Space (1951) as early, influential modern works that emphasized the scientific and engineering aspects of space travel. From the 1960s on, growing popular interest in modern technology  also led to increasing depictions of interplanetary spaceships based on advanced plausible extensions of real modern technology. The Alien franchise features ships with Ion propulsion, a developing technology at the time that would be used years later in the Deep Space 1, Hayabusa 1 and SMART-1 spacecraft.

Interstellar travel

Slower than light 
With regard to interstellar travel, in which faster-than-light speeds are generally considered unrealistic, more realistic depictions of interstellar travel have often focused on the idea of "generation ships" that travel at sub-light speed for many generations before arriving at their destinations. Other scientifically plausible concepts of interstellar travel include suspended animation and, less often, ion drive, solar sail, Bussard ramjet, and time dilation.

Faster than light 
Some works discuss Einstein's general theory of relativity and challenges that it faces from quantum mechanics, and include concepts of space travel through wormholes or black holes. Many writers, however, gloss over such problems, introducing entirely fictional concepts such as hyperspace (also, subspace, nulspace, overspace, jumpspace, or slipstream) travel using inventions such as hyperdrive, jump drive, warp drive, or space folding. Invention of completely made-up devices enabling space travel has a long tradition — already in the early 20th century, Verne criticized H. G. Wells' The First Men in the Moon (1901) for abandoning realistic science (his spaceship relied on anti-gravitic material called "cavorite"). Of fictitious drives, by the mid-1970s the concept of hyperspace travel was described as having achieved the most popularity, and would subsequently be further popularized — as hyperdrive — through its use in the Star Wars franchise. While the fictitious drives "solved" problems related to physics (the difficulty of faster-than-light travel), some writers introduce new wrinkles — for example, a common trope involves the difficulty of using such drives in close proximity to other objects, in some cases allowing their use only beginning from the outskirts of the solar systems.

While usually the means of space travel is just a means to an end, in some works, particularly short stories, it is a central plot device. These works focus on themes such as the mysteries of hyperspace, or the consequences of getting lost after an error or malfunction.

See also 
 Flying saucer
 Human spaceflight
 Science fictional space warfare
 Space elevator
 Space flight simulation game
 Unidentified flying object

Notes

References

Further reading

External links

Science fiction themes